Guy Seyve (born 26 May 1942) is a French former racing cyclist. He rode in the 1964 Tour de France.

References

1942 births
Living people
French male cyclists
Place of birth missing (living people)